Cyclostrema gyalum is a species of sea snail, a marine gastropod mollusk in the family Liotiidae.

Description
The height of the shell attains 2 mm, its diameter 5 mm. The shell contains  5 whorls and a minute nucleus. The whorls increase rapidly in size. The body whorl contains three acute keels. The basal keel encircles the umbilicus, which is particularly large and deep compared to the size of the shell. The aperture has a square shape. The thin outer lip is angulate.

Distribution
This species occurs in the Persian Gulf and the Gulf of Oman.

References

External links
 To World Register of Marine Species

gyalum
Gastropods described in 1904